Clanculus albanyensis, common name the yellow top shell, is a species of sea snail, a marine gastropod mollusk in the family Trochidae, the top snails.

Description
The height of the shell attains 12 mm. The umbilicate shell has a conoidal shape. It is isabella-colored and sculptured with very fine spiral lirae, about 11 on the penultimate whorl, 40 on the last whorl.  They are on the upper whorls distinctly granulose, on the last almost entirely smooth. The 6 to 7 whorls are rather rounded with a convex base, the last one is scarcely angled. The margin of the narrow umbilicus is dentate. The columella is very oblique, not solute above and terminates below in a simple, small denticle. The outer lip is thickened within with five folds but near the edge with numerous wrinkles.

Distribution
This marine species is endemic to Australia and occurs off South Australia, Tasmania, Victoria and Western Australia.

References

 Philippi, R.A. 1849. Trochidae. 73-120, pls 36-39 in Küster, H.C. (ed). Systematisches Conchylien-Cabinet von Martini und Chemnitz. Nürnberg : Bauer & Raspe Vol. II.
 Philippi, R.A. 1852. Trochidae. pp. 233–248 in Küster, H.C. (ed). Systematisches Conchylien-Cabinet von Martini und Chemnitz. Nürnberg : Bauer & Raspe Vol. 2.
 
 
 May, W.L. 1921. A Checklist of the Mollusca of Tasmania. Hobart, Tasmania : Government Printer 114 pp.
 May, W.L. 1923. An Illustrated Index of Tasmanian Shells. Hobart : Government Printer 100 pp.
 Cotton, B.C. 1959. South Australian Mollusca. Archaeogastropoda. Handbook of the Flora and Fauna of South Australia. Adelaide : South Australian Government Printer 449 pp
 Macpherson, J.H. & Gabriel, C.J. 1962. Marine Molluscs of Victoria. Melbourne : Melbourne University Press & National Museum of Victoria 475 pp.
 
 Wilson, B. 1994. Australian Marine Shells. Prosobranch Gastropods. Kallaroo, WA : Odyssey Publishing Vol. 2 370 pp.

External links

External links
 To World Register of Marine Species

albanyensis
Gastropods of Australia
Gastropods described in 1995